Yoann Kowal (born 28 May 1987) is a French middle distance runner who specializes in the 1500 metres and 3000 metres steeplechase.

Personal life
Kowal is married to Marianne and has a daughter Elea. His father Daniel held the national title in the 3000 m steeplechase, and his mother Nadine was a French duathlon champion. Kowal took up athletics aged four and started competing internationally in 2009. He frequently trains in Kenya. As of 2016 he served in the French military, with the Joinville Battalion at Fontainebleau.

Career
Kowal won his first senior title in unusual circumstances at the 2014 European Athletics Championships in Zürich. After initially finishing second in the 3000 metres steeplechase, Kowal was upgraded to the gold medal position when race winner and French teammate Mahiedine Mekhissi-Benabbad was disqualified for removing his shirt in the home straight.

Competition record

Personal bests
Outdoor
1500 metres – 3:33.75 min (2011)
3000 metres – 7:45.11 min (2016)
3000 metres steeplechase – 8:12.53 min (2013)
Indoor
1500 metres – 3:38.07 min (2011)
2000 metres – 5:04.18 min (2013)
3000 metres – 7:44.26 min (2012)

References

1987 births
Living people
French male middle-distance runners
French male steeplechase runners
Olympic athletes of France
Athletes (track and field) at the 2012 Summer Olympics
Athletes (track and field) at the 2016 Summer Olympics
World Athletics Championships athletes for France
European Athletics Championships medalists
French people of Polish descent
French male cross country runners
Sportspeople from Eure-et-Loir
Athletes (track and field) at the 2022 Mediterranean Games
Mediterranean Games competitors for France
21st-century French people